Ephrata (Pennsylvania Dutch: Effridaa) is a borough in Lancaster County, Pennsylvania, United States. Ephrata's sister city is Eberbach, Germany, the city where its founders originated. In its early history, Ephrata was a pleasure resort and an agricultural community.

Ephrata's population has steadily grown over the last century. In 1900, 2,452 people lived there, and by 1940, the population had increased to 6,199. The population was 13,818 at the 2020 census. Ephrata is the most populous borough in Lancaster County.

History

Ephrata is noteworthy for having been the former seat of the Mystic Order of the Solitary, a semimonastic order of Seventh-Day Dunkers. The community, which contained both men and women, was founded by Johann Conrad Beissel in 1732.

Many of the members were well-educated; Peter Miller, second prior of the monastery, translated the Declaration of Independence into seven languages, at the request of Congress. At the period of its greatest prosperity the community contained nearly 300 persons.

The Ephrata Commercial Historic District, Ephrata Cloister, Eby Shoe Corporation buildings, Connell Mansion, Mentzer Building, and Mountain Springs Hotel are listed on the National Register of Historic Places.

Geography
Ephrata is located in northeastern Lancaster County at  (40.17870, −76.17744). U.S. Route 322 passes through the center of the borough as Main Street; it leads northwest  to Hershey and southeast  to West Chester. Pennsylvania Route 272 passes through the northwest side of Ephrata, leading northeast  to Adamstown and southwest  to Lancaster, the county seat. Like the rest of the county, the surrounding land is mostly flat and suitable for farming.

Cocalico Creek flows through the borough just north of the center of town; it is a southwest-flowing tributary of the Conestoga River and part of the Susquehanna River watershed.

The hardiness zone is 6b.

Demographics

As of the census of 2000, there were 13,213 people, 5,477 households, and 3,565 families residing in the borough. The population density was 3,672.7 people per square mile (1,417.1/km²). There were 5,672 housing units at an average density of 1,576.6 per square mile (608.3/km²). The racial makeup of the borough was 96.10% White, 0.64% Black or African American, 0.26% Native American, 1.06% Asian, 0.14% Pacific Islander, 0.82% from other races, and 0.98% from two or more races. 2.75% of the population were Hispanic or Latino of any race.

There were 5,477 households, out of which 30.1% had children under the age of 18 living with them, 52.6% were married couples living together, 8.6% had a female householder with no husband present, and 34.9% were non-families. 28.6% of all households were made up of individuals, and 11.1% had someone living alone who was 65 years of age or older. The average household size was 2.38 and the average family size was 2.94.

In the borough, the population was spread out, with 24.0% under the age of 18, 8.5% from 18 to 24, 32.1% from 25 to 44, 21.6% from 45 to 64, and 13.9% who were 65 years of age or older. The median age was 36 years. For every 100 females, there were 95.6 males. For every 100 females age 18 and over, there were 92.7 males.

The median income for a household in the borough was $41,550, and the median income for a family was $48,213. Males had a median income of $35,095 versus $22,782 for females. The per capita income for the borough was $19,659. About 3.7% of families and 6.2% of the population were below the poverty line, including 5.5% of those under age 18 and 7.4% of those age 65 or over.

Community pool
The Borough of Ephrata owns and operates the Ephrata Community Pool at 418 Vine Street. The pool is the oldest continuously operating swimming pool in Lancaster County, finishing its 84th year of operation in September 2015. A newly remodeled pool opened on May 26, 2012. It contains zero-depth entries, flume slides, and climbing walls, among other things.

Libraries
Akron borough council cut the line item for the Ephrata Public Library from its $1.9 million proposed general budget for 2023. It has not yet voted to ratify that budget.

Schools
Schools in Ephrata are part of the Ephrata Area School District.

Elementary
 Akron Elementary School
 Highland Elementary School
 Clay Elementary School
 Fulton Elementary School

Middle
 Ephrata Middle School

High
 Ephrata High School

Economy 

Ephrata has a mix of large and small businesses of many types including produce distributor 
Four Seasons Produce founded in 1976.

In August 2011, a luxury rehabilitation center opened adding over 175 new jobs.

Religion
Ephrata has a diverse mix of churches and faith groups, primarily Christian. The countryside surrounding Ephrata is home to a large number of Amish and Old Order Mennonite families.

Public services

The Ephrata Public Library, on South Reading Road, is a member of the Library System of Lancaster County.

Infrastructure

Transportation
U.S. Route 322 passes northwest-southeast through Ephrata along Main Street, with an interchange at US 222 east of the borough. Said interchange was converted to a diverging diamond interchange in 2021. Pennsylvania Route 272 passes southwest-northeast through Ephrata along Reading Road, heading through the western part of the borough. The Red Rose Transit Authority (RRTA) provides bus service to Ephrata along Route 11, which operates from the Walmart in Ephrata through the downtown area and south to downtown Lancaster. There is a park and ride lot at the now former Kmart in Ephrata that is served by RRTA.

The Reading and Columbia Railroad operated passenger service through downtown Ephrata until 1952. The East Penn Railroad continues to operate freight service from Ephrata north to Reading on the Lancaster Northern line, while the line between Ephrata and Lititz, to the southwest, has been converted into a rail trail.

Utilities
The Borough of Ephrata Electric Division provides electricity to most of Ephrata with PPL Corporation providing electricity to part of the borough. The Borough of Ephrata Electric Division dates back to 1902, when the borough purchased it from the Lancaster Valley Electric Company for $7,000. The borough operated a small generating plant on South State Street before the Ephrata Borough Electric Plant was built on Church Avenue in 1924. The electric plant operated until 1965 when increased demand for electricity led the borough to purchase power from outside sources. The Borough of Ephrata Electric Division provides 140 million kilowatt-hours of electricity annually and has $18.6 million in sales. The Ephrata Area Joint Authority (EAJA) provides water to Ephrata along with Ephrata Township and Clay Township, serving 8,222 customers. The agency provides 700 million gallons of water annually, with water coming from the Cocalico Creek and groundwater wells. The EAJA operates a filtration treatment plant and has three wells and four storage tanks to store water. Trash and recycling collection in Ephrata is provided by the borough through a contract with Eagle Disposal or residents may choose to have a contract with another trash hauler. Natural gas service in Ephrata is provided by UGI Utilities.

Health care
WellSpan Health operates the WellSpan Ephrata Community Hospital in Ephrata, which serves the borough and surrounding areas in northern Lancaster County. The hospital has 133 acute care beds and 8 acute rehabilitation beds and offers an emergency room, a cancer center, and a maternity unit among other inpatient and outpatient services.

Law and government 
Ephrata is a borough. The mayor is Ralph Mowen.

"Ephrata" is also used to refer to the surrounding Ephrata Township.

Elected officials representing Ephrata
Pennsylvania Governor Tom Wolf (D)
Senior United States Senator Bob Casey Jr. (D)
Junior United States Senator Pat Toomey (R)
United States Congressman Lloyd Smucker (R)
Pennsylvania State Representative David H. Zimmerman (R)
Pennsylvania State Senator Ryan Aument (R)
Ephrata Borough Council: Susan Rowe, President; Thomas Reinhold, Vice-President; Victor Richard, Melvin Weiler, Tim Barr, Linda Martin, Ricky Ressler, Gregory Zimmerman
Ephrata Mayor Ralph Mowen (R)

Notable people
 Michael Akers, film director, producer, screenwriter and editor
 Evelyn Margaret Ay, Miss America 1954
 Guy K. Bard, educator and judge, Attorney General of Pennsylvania (1938–1939), first person from Lancaster County to be appointed a U.S. federal judge
 Jacob Hibshman, U.S. Congressman for Pennsylvania's 3rd congressional district from 1819 to 1821
 Charles B. McVay III, rear admiral and commanding officer, USS Indianapolis (CA-35) at the time of its sinking in 1945
 Mike Mentzer, professional bodybuilder and 1979 Mr. Olympia heavyweight champion
 Ray Mentzer, professional bodybuilder and 1979 AAU Mr. America
 Stanley "Whitey" von Nieda, NBA basketball player 
 Murray Merle Schwartz, United States District Court judge
 Richard D. Winters: Major, "E Company”, 2nd Battalion, 506th Parachute Infantry Regiment, 101st Airborne Division
Texas In July, Metalcore Band

Sites of interest

Museums and historic sites

Eicher Arts Center – Occupies Conrad Beissel's historic Eicher House. It also contains an Indian (Native American) museum and shop.
Ephrata Cloister
Main Theater – The Main Theater, built by the Stiefel brothers, held its grand opening Christmas Day in 1938. The first film to show was Just Around the Corner starring Shirley Temple. In 1990, the Denver and Ephrata Telephone Company purchased the theater to restore the building and once again provide movies and live productions to the area, with many original fixtures incorporated into the renovated venue.  The theater reopened November 12, 1993.
Mountain Springs Hotel – The site of the former hotel stands at the corner of Main Street (U.S. Route 322) and Spring Garden Street. Unoccupied for a long period of time, it was torn down in 2004, except for a small portion of the original building, which was preserved and renovated to be used as a conference center and, possibly, as a museum. A Hampton Inn was constructed at the site in September 2005. An Applebee's restaurant was also built, and there are plans for an office building.
Ephrata Performing Arts Center – The Ephrata Performing Arts Center (known as EPAC), started as the Legion Star Playhouse in 1953 under the direction of John Cameron.  In 1972, following Cameron's departure, volunteers took over the production of regular shows, and eventually incorporated as a non-profit in 1979, the first season under the name of EPAC came in 1980.  Following a 2.4 million dollar renovation, the community theater was able to and still produces year round theater, including plays, musicals, a children's series, regular educational opportunities (including a summer theater camp), and special performances.
Gameseum: Mega-Arcade & Museum – Opening on June 28, 2019, Gameseum: Mega-Arcade & Museum (also known as just "Gameseum") is a hands-on museum that doubles as an Amusement arcade, featuring primarily retro coin-op games, most of which are considered historic. The games no longer accept coins, are set to free-play, and an admission system is used. Over 50 games such as Pac-Man, Ms. Pac-Man, Galaxian, Galaga, Donkey Kong, an assortment of pinball machines, an air hockey machine, a Skee-Ball machine, and others can be played. Gameseum is officially registered as a museum in the Borough of Ephrata. The term "Gameseum" is an active federal Trademark, first registered on December 5, 2017, by Steven Van Splinter Jr., the museum's owner.

Area attractions
The Ephrata Fair – is the largest street fair in Pennsylvania, the fair dates back to October 1919, when local businessmen organized a one-day festivity to commemorate World War I veterans. Over the following years, the fair grew to include farmers celebrating the harvest; and it also grew in duration by several days.  The popular parade was added in 1932.  Today, the fair is held for five days during every September and attracts tens of thousands of visitors every year.

Sister city 
Ephrata has one sister city, as designated by Sister Cities International:    
  Eberbach, Baden-Württemberg, Germany

Tornado
On March 29, 2009, a strong storm briefly swept through Ephrata. On March 31, the National Weather Service confirmed that it was an EF1 tornado. Strong hail came with it. Although there were no fatalities, 30 homes were damaged and 8 mobile homes were destroyed. Many vehicles could be seen on their side afterwards, and holes were put in houses from the hail.

References

External links

Ephrata Area Chamber of Commerce

 
Populated places established in 1732
Boroughs in Lancaster County, Pennsylvania
1891 establishments in Pennsylvania